Piet Velthuizen ( born 3 November 1986) is a Dutch goalkeeper. He participated in the 2008 Summer Olympics.

Club career

Vitesse
Velthuizen made his first team debut on 31 December 2006, in the 2–2 away match against Willem II. His career developed rapidly, and according to Sky Sports, he was among the most promising goalkeepers in Europe in 2008. He broke into the Vitesse first team in the 2007–08 season, when he signed a contract extension until 2011.

Hércules
In the summer of 2010 Velthuizen joined Spanish side Hércules for €800,000 as they sought to strengthen their squad for their first season back in the top flight after a thirteen year absence. He had to settle as second choice to Calatayud, making just 5 appearances in all competitions.

Vitesse return
After one solitary season in Spain which culminated with Hércules being relegated Velthuizen re-joined Vitesse and instantly became first-choice goalkeeper again. He remained a constant in the Vitesse goal until November 2014 when he lost his place to Eloy Room. After his only appearance of the 2015/16 season coming in a 4-1 extra time defeat to Heracles Almelo in a cup match in which Vitesse had to play the entire period of extra time with 8 men due to three sendings off, he departed at the end of his contract.

Hapoel Haifa
Velthuizen then moved on to Israel joining Hapoel Haifa. He was their main goalie as they finished in 8th place - their highest finish in 16 years.

Omonia Nicosia
On 17 July 2017, Velthuizen signed a contract with the Cypriot First Division club Omonia Nicosia where he would play alongside compatriot Hedwiges Maduro. He would end up cancelling his contract on 1 January 2018 after just 9 games.

AZ Alkmaar
After two seasons away Velthuizen returned to the country of his birth joining AZ Alkmaar on 28 August 2018 as back up to Marco Bizot after an injury to the normal number two Rody de Boer. This spell ultimately proved unsuccessful as he failed to make an appearance and was released at the end of the season.

Telstar
On 10 February 2020, after seven months without a club, he joined Telstar in the Eerste Divisie. He left the club at the end of the season.

Fortuna Sittard
On 26 February 2021, Velthuizen joined Fortuna Sittard on a deal for the rest of the season. He got his debut for the club two days later against FC Groningen.

International career
Velthuizen received his first call-up to the Dutch squad on 21 March 2008 for the friendly match against Austria. On 5 September 2009, he made his debut for the national team in a friendly match against Japan after coming on as a half time substitute for Michel Vorm. He managed to keep a clean sheet in the 3–0 win. Currently he is no longer part of the national football team.

2008 Summer Olympics
He was selected by Foppe de Haan to be in the squad for the 2008 Olympic Games in Beijing, China. Although being first choice in most of the run-up to the Olympics, he was told by De Haan he would be second choice after the other Dutch goalkeeper in the squad; Kenneth Vermeer.

Career statistics

References

External links
 Voetbal International profile 

1986 births
Living people
Footballers from Nijmegen
Dutch footballers
Dutch expatriate footballers
Association football goalkeepers
Netherlands international footballers
Footballers at the 2008 Summer Olympics
Olympic footballers of the Netherlands
SBV Vitesse players
Hércules CF players
Hapoel Haifa F.C. players
AC Omonia players
AZ Alkmaar players
SC Telstar players
Fortuna Sittard players
Eredivisie players
La Liga players
Israeli Premier League players
Expatriate footballers in Spain
Dutch expatriate sportspeople in Spain
Expatriate footballers in Israel
Dutch expatriate sportspeople in Israel
Expatriate footballers in Cyprus
Dutch expatriate sportspeople in Cyprus
Quick 1888 players